Helix Energy Solutions Group, Inc. v. Hewitt, 598 U.S. ___ (2023), was a United States Supreme Court case related to the Fair Labor Standards Act of 1938.

Background 

Michael Hewitt was a toolpusher (a supervisor) on oil rigs for Helix Energy Solutions Group He was paid over $200,000 each year he worked for the company, at a flat daily rate. Hewitt was fired from the company in 2017, and the reasons are in dispute. He then filed a collective action under the Fair Labor Standards Act (FLSA) against Helix, asserting he was entitled to overtime pay. Various FLSA regulations exempt employees from overtime if they (1) perform managerial duties, (2) earn $100,000 or more each year, and (3) receive a weekly salary of $455 or higher on a salary basis. Hewitt fulfilled the first two conditions, but not the third, as he was paid daily. The United States District Court for the Southern District of Texas rejected Hewitt's claim, but the United States Court of Appeals for the Fifth Circuit reversed in a 2–1 opinion. The court later granted rehearing en banc and again reversed, this time in a 12–6 vote.

Helix filed a petition for a writ of certiorari.

Supreme Court 

Certiorari was granted in the case on May 2, 2022. Oral arguments were held on October 12, 2022. On February 22, 2023, the Supreme Court affirmed the Fifth Circuit in a 6–3 decision.

References

External links 
 

2023 in United States case law
United States Supreme Court cases
United States Supreme Court cases of the Roberts Court
United States labor case law